Olympic Stadium is the name usually given to the main stadium of an Olympic Games. An Olympic stadium is the site of the opening and closing ceremonies. Many, though not all, of these venues actually contain the words Olympic Stadium as part of their names, such as stadiums in Amsterdam, Berlin, Helsinki and Paris. Olympic Stadium may also be named a multi-purpose stadium which hosts Olympic sports.

In the case of the Summer Olympic Games, athletics competitions and the football final are traditionally held in the Olympic Stadium. Exceptions to this have occurred though at the 1900, 1996 and 2016 Summer Olympics as well as at the 2010 and 2018 Summer Youth Olympic Games.

Early Winter Olympic Games often used figure skating venues as focal points. These were often designated as the Olympic Stadium,  usually hosting the opening and closing ceremonies.

A number of stadiums have been used in more than one Olympics, in those cities that have held the Games more than once.

Lysgårdsbakken was the main stadium of a Winter Olympics and a Winter Youth Olympic Games (YOG). Bergiselschanze was the main stadium of two Winter Olympics and one Winter YOG. Olympiahalle jointly shared the Olympic Stadium role with Bergiselschanze during the two Winter Olympics, but not during the Winter YOG. Only one stadium, the Los Angeles Memorial Coliseum, has been the main stadium of two Summer Olympics (and it will be a main stadium a third time during the 2028 games). In addition to the inaugural Summer Olympics, Panathinaiko Stadio was also the main stadium of the only Intercalated Games held. The other, National Stadium in Tokyo was the main stadium hosted the 1964 Summer Olympics (the first in Asia), when the 2020 games chosen to be as the main stadium and was decided to rebuild a new one. Beijing National Stadium was the main stadium being hosted at two Olympics, but with a special distinction: it would become the only stadium to have been such at both a Summer and a Winter Olympics.

A number, including both the Panathinaiko Stadio and the Vélodrome de Vincennes, have hosted events at subsequent Olympics. The London Games of 2012 were not opened and closed at the rebuilt Wembley Stadium, the site of the 1948 Olympic Stadium, but instead at a new stadium in Stratford. Wembley was, however, the venue for some 2012 Olympic football matches. Likewise, the Melbourne Cricket Ground, which was the centrepiece stadium for the 1956 games, later hosted the first games of the Sydney 2000 football tournament. Lake Placid's 1932 Olympic Stadium was utilized in the 1980 Lake Placid games as the speed skating venue. Olympiahalle hosted figure skating and short-track speed skating during the 2012 Winter Youth Olympics. Stockholm Olympic Stadium hosted equestrian events for the 1956 Summer Olympics (while the 1956 games were held in Melbourne, Australia, quarantine restrictions prevented equestrian events from being held domestically, thus Stockholm, Sweden hosted the 1956 equestrian competitions).

Stadia

Notes

Other major events held at Olympic Stadiums

References

External links
Olympic Past and Future Stadiums -  BALLPARKS.com
 Summer Olympic Stadiums (Stadia) 1896 - (2020) on Google Maps (select "Sat View")

 
Olympic
Stadium